Jack Ginnivan (born 9 December 2002) is an Australian rules footballer playing for the Collingwood Football Club in the Australian Football League (AFL).

Early life and state football
Ginnivan started playing Australian rules football at the age of six, following Hawthorn winning the 2008 AFL Grand Final. As a youth, he played for the Newstead Football Club in the Maryborough Castlemaine District Football League and at the age of 11, kicked his 100th goal for the club. Later, he played junior football for Strathfieldsaye Storm in the Bendigo Football Netball League, helping them win a premiership in 2019. In 2020, Ginnivan played for Bendigo Pioneers in the NAB League and was selected for the Vic Country team. Ginnivan studied at Bendigo Senior Secondary College and grew up supporting Hawthorn.

AFL career

2021: Debut season 
Ginnivan was drafted by Collingwood with their first pick of the 2021 rookie draft, which was the 13th pick overall. After kicking 11 goals over three matches in the Victorian Football League (VFL), including several four-goal games, Ginnivan made his AFL debut against Port Adelaide in the nineteenth round of the 2021 AFL season, at Marvel Stadium. He played in the last five games of the season, kicking six goals.

2022: Breakout season as a youngster 
In the 2022 Anzac Day match, in just his tenth career game, Ginnivan kicked five goals and won the Anzac Medal as best on ground, as well as the Rising Star nomination for round 6. As his second season progressed, he quickly became a high profile and controversial player, after gaining a reputation among media and rival spectators for ducking or shrugging into high tackles to win free kicks, and later admitting to doing so deliberately and even practising the technique in an unusually frank interview. 

Ginnivan was booed by rival fans for much of the end of his second season – including an infamous incident when Sydney fans booed him after he had left the game with injury, drawing considerable scorn towards those fans in the media.

Statistics
Updated to the end of the 2022 season.

|-
| scope="row" | 2021 ||  || 33
| 5 || 6 || 3 || 38 || 7 || 45 || 18 || 4 || 1.2 || 0.6 || 7.6 || 1.4 || 9.0 || 3.6 || 0.8 || 0
|-
| scope="row" | 2022 ||  || 33
| 23 || 40 || 19 || 161 || 62 || 223 || 62 || 34 || 1.7 || 0.8 || 7.0 || 2.7 || 9.7 || 2.7 || 1.5 || 3
|- class="sortbottom"
! colspan=3| Career
! 28 !! 46 !! 22 !! 199 !! 69 !! 268 !! 80 !! 38 !! 1.6 !! 0.8 !! 7.1 !! 2.5 !! 9.6 !! 2.9 !! 1.4 !! 3
|}

Honours and achievements
Individual
 22under22 team: 2022
 Anzac Day Medal: 2022
 AFL Rising Star nominee: 2022 (round 6)

References

External links

2002 births
Collingwood Football Club players
Bendigo Pioneers players
Living people
Australian rules footballers from Bendigo